Michael Andrew Sembello (born April 17, 1954) is an American singer, guitarist, keyboardist, songwriter, composer and producer from Philadelphia, Pennsylvania.

Sembello was nominated for an Academy Award and a Golden Globe for his 1983 song "Maniac", which he sang and co-wrote. The song reached number one in the United States and featured in the Flashdance film soundtrack.

He is the brother of the late songwriter and composer Danny Sembello and the late singer songwriter John Sembello of Dino & Sembello fame.

Early life
Sembello was born and raised in Ardmore, Pennsylvania, a western suburb of Philadelphia.

Career
Sembello began his career in music as a session musician, working as a guitarist. By age 17, he was working professionally with Stevie Wonder on electric and acoustic guitar as a studio player on Wonder's Fulfillingness' First Finale. He continued the same year, chosen as one of the core artists who worked on Songs in the Key of Life, an ambitious double album that took two years to create. He was credited as lead and rhythm guitarist on most of the tracks—including the intricate jazz rock lead guitar part of the instrumental "Contusion"—and shares songwriting credit with Wonder on the song "Saturn", according to the album's liner notes.

Sembello wrote the song "Carousel", which Michael Jackson recorded for his 1982 album Thriller, but it was replaced on the track list by "Human Nature".

The song was included as a bonus track on Thriller 25, the 25th-anniversary edition reissue of the album; the full version was released on iTunes in 2013 as part of The Ultimate Fan Extras Collection.

Sembello released his first solo album Bossa Nova Hotel in 1983. The song "Maniac" from that album, which he co-wrote with his keyboardist Dennis Matkosky, was selected for inclusion in the film Flashdance. "Maniac" was the second-best-charting song from the soundtrack (after the title track) and the ninth-biggest single of 1983. That soundtrack won a Grammy Award in 1984 for Best Album of Original Score Written for a Motion Picture or a Television Special. Sembello and Matkosky have claimed that the song was supposed to be about a vicious pet murderer after having seen a slasher flick, possibly Maniac or The Texas Chain Saw Massacre. In 2020, Sembello, along with Matkosky, appeared in Maniac Men, an interview included on the 4K UHD Blu-ray reissue of Maniac.

Sembello produced guitarist Jennifer Batten's first solo album Above Below and Beyond in 1992. In 1994, he produced Argentine singer Valeria Lynch's album Caravana de Sueños (1994), and co-wrote the title song with lyricist César Isella and composer Armando Tejada Gómez.

Sembello's songs are featured in the films Cocoon, Independence Day, Gremlins, The Monster Squad and Summer Lovers. His song "Gravity" from Cocoon was accompanied by a music video directed by the film's director Ron Howard and included an appearance by Howard in a scripted fictional foreword to the video.

In 2008, Sembello worked with saxophonist Michael Lington on his album Heat, nominated as Jazztrax Album of the Year for 2008. Michael and his brother Danny Sembello penned three songs with Lington for the project.

May 2009, Sembello assembled Bruce Gaitsch (bass, guitar) and Janey Clewer (keyboards, vocals) to form the trio The Bossa Nova Hotel, named after his 1983 Warner Bros. Records debut. They recorded the album Moon Island, released on EMI Japan. The album consists of American pop songs given arrangements with a strong Brazilian influence.

Shortly after The Bossa Nova Hotel's rendition of the jazz standard Manhã de Carnaval enjoyed success as the theme to the Japanese television series, LIFE!, the trio regrouped in 2016 to record a cover of Sting's Fragile.

Sembello has recorded his vocals in six languages.

Discography

Studio albums
 Bossa Nova Hotel (1983) – US #80
 Without Walls (1986)
 Caravan of Dreams (1992)
 Backwards in Time (1997)
 Ancient Future (2002)

Compilation albums
 The Lost Years (2003)

with The Bossa Nova Hotel
 Moon Island (2009)

Singles

See also
List of artists who reached number one in the United States

References

External links
Michael & Danny Sembello Official Website

1954 births
Living people
American people of Italian descent
20th-century American singers
20th-century American writers
20th-century American composers
21st-century American singers
21st-century American composers
American acoustic guitarists
American male guitarists
American film score composers
American hi-NRG musicians
American male singer-songwriters
American pop guitarists
American pop rock singers
Record producers from Pennsylvania
American multi-instrumentalists
American session musicians
American synth-pop musicians
EMI Records artists
Grammy Award winners
American male film score composers
A&M Records artists
Warner Records artists
Singer-songwriters from Pennsylvania
20th-century American guitarists
21st-century American guitarists
Guitarists from Philadelphia
20th-century American male singers
21st-century American male singers
Frontiers Records artists